Daniel Kani Kauahi (born September 6, 1959) is the assistant head coach for the Arizona Rattlers in the Indoor Football League (AFL). He joined the Rattlers in 2007 as the defensive line coach.

Playing career
Kauahi grew up on the Hawaiian island of Kaua'i, and played college football with the Arizona State Sun Devils and the Hawaii Warriors. He then played center for 12 seasons in Pro Football, with the Seattle Seahawks, the Green Bay Packers, the Phoenix Cardinals, the Kansas City Chiefs and Saskatchewan Roughriders.

Coaching career
Kauahi has coached at the college level (Mesa Community College), and at the professional level in the NFL (Arizona Cardinals), the CFL (BC Lions, Ottawa Renegades, and the Hamilton Tiger-Cats), and in the XFL (San Francisco Rage).

Kani also was the offensive line coach one season for his son's high school football team, Desert Vista High School, in Phoenix, Arizona.

Most recently Kauahi has been coaching at the University of Waterloo in Waterloo, Ontario as the Offensive Line Coach.
Also, coaching with the Arizona Rattlers.

External links
 Arizona Rattlers bio
 Waterloo Warriors bio 

1959 births
Living people
People from Kauai County, Hawaii
Sportspeople from Hawaii
Kamehameha Schools alumni
American football centers
Seattle Seahawks players
Green Bay Packers players
Phoenix Cardinals players
Kansas City Chiefs players
Saskatchewan Roughriders
Arizona Cardinals coaches
BC Lions coaches
Ottawa Renegades coaches
Hamilton Tiger-Cats coaches
Arizona Rattlers coaches
Waterloo Warriors football coaches